Patricia Stalder Morehead (born July 21, 1936) was an American educator and politician.

Morehead was born in Falls City, Nebraska. She went to MacMurray College in Jacksonville, Illinois and University of Nebraska Omaha. She received her bachelor's degree from University of Nebraska–Lincoln in 1958. She lived in Beatrice, Nebraska and taught in the elementary and secondary private and public schools. Morehead served in the Nebraska Legislature from 1983 until 1988 and was involved with the Democratic Party.

References

1936 births
Living people
People from Beatrice, Nebraska
People from Falls City, Nebraska
Schoolteachers from Nebraska
MacMurray College alumni
University of Nebraska–Lincoln alumni
University of Nebraska Omaha alumni
Women state legislators in Nebraska
Democratic Party Nebraska state senators